Margaret Purdy (born January 18, 1995) is a Canadian former competitive pair skater. With Michael Marinaro, she is the 2013 World Junior silver medalist and 2010 Canadian national junior champion.

Personal life 
Purdy attended the University of Western Ontario from September 2014 to 2018, studying social sciences.

Career 
Purdy started skating at age four as a hockey player and switched to figure skating at age seven.

In May 2007, Purdy teamed up with Michael Marinaro to train in pairs. In the 2009–10 season, they debuted on the ISU Junior Grand Prix series and won the Canadian junior title. The pair placed eighth in The Hague at their first World Junior Championships.

In the 2011–12 season, Purdy/Marinaro won their first JGP medal — bronze in Latvia — and placed fifth at the 2012 World Junior Championships in Minsk. The following season, they won gold at their two JGP assignments, in the United States and Croatia, and qualified for the JGP Final, where they placed fourth. The pair took silver at the 2013 World Junior Championships in Milan, behind Haven Denney / Brandon Frazier.

In September 2013, Purdy/Marinaro and their coaches moved their training base from Strathroy to Komoka. The pair appeared at two senior Grand Prix events, the 2013 Skate America and 2013 Skate Canada International, finishing eighth at both. After placing fifth at the 2014 Canadians, they were assigned to the 2014 Four Continents and came in sixth. On May 27, 2014, they announced the end of their partnership and Purdy retired from elite competition.

Programs 
(with Marinaro)

Competitive highlights 
(with Marinaro)

References

External links 

 

1995 births
Canadian female pair skaters
Living people
Sportspeople from London, Ontario
World Junior Figure Skating Championships medalists